Endeavour is a British television detective drama series created by Russell Lewis and co-produced by Mammoth Screen and Masterpiece in association with ITV Studios. It is a prequel to the long-running Inspector Morse series and was first broadcast on ITV in the United Kingdom on 2 January 2012 and on PBS in the United States on 1 July 2012, as part of the Masterpiece Mystery! anthology. Eight series have been broadcast, with the latest completed on 26 September 2021. Series 9 is scheduled to air on 26 February 2023 and shall be the final series.

An Endeavour episode may comprise some of the following cast members: Shaun Evans (DC/DS Endeavour Morse), Roger Allam (DCI Fred Thursday), James Bradshaw (Dr Max DeBryn), Anton Lesser (CS Reginald Bright), Sean Rigby (PC/DS Jim Strange), Jack Laskey (DS Peter Jakes), Caroline O’Neill (Win Thursday), Jack Bannon (Sam Thursday), Sara Vickers (Joan Thursday), Abigail Thaw (Dorothea Frazil), Dakota Blue Richards (WPC Shirley Trewlove), Lewis Peek (DC George Fancy), Simon Harrison (DI Ronnie Box) and Richard Riddell (DS Alan Jago).

On 23 May 2022, ITV and Mammoth Screen announced that Endeavour would end after nine series, bringing the total number of episodes to 36, including the pilot episode.

Series overview

Episodes

Pilot (2012)

Series 1 (2013)

Series 2 (2014)

Series 3 (2016)

Series 4 (2017)

Series 5 (2018)

Series 6 (2019)

Series 7 (2020)
Series 7 took place in 1970, with Russell Lewis writing the episodes. In the US, Series 7 aired Sundays August 9–23, 2020 (9:00 pm) on PBS as Masterpiece Theater.

Series 8 (2021)
Series 8 was broadcast from 12 September 2021 and took place in 1971, with Russell Lewis writing and Shaun Evans, Ian Aryeh and Kate Saxon directing the episodes.

Series 9 (2023)

Series 9 is scheduled to air on 26 February 2023, with the final three episodes set in 1972. It will be the final series to air, by agreement of PBS Masterpiece, ITV and the cast. This was posted to the Endeavour Twitter account on 23 May 2022. Russell Lewis will write the final three episodes. Shaun Evans, Nirpal Bhogal and Kate Saxon will direct the final three episodes. The story comes to its logical end in Series 9, in telling how Inspector Morse developed into the character of the Morse series, across 72 hours of television episodes in ten years. Filming was underway in Oxford on 22 May 2022. The announcement of the final season was made a week or so before Season 8 began airing in the US on 19 June 2022.

Notes

References

External links
 

Lists of British crime television series episodes
Lists of British drama television series episodes
Inspector Morse
ITV-related lists